The sergeant at arms and doorkeeper of the United States Senate (originally known as the doorkeeper of the Senate from April 7, 1789 – 1798) is the protocol officer, executive officer, and highest-ranking federal law enforcement officer of the Senate of the United States. The office of the sergeant at arms of the Senate currently has just short of 1,000 full time staff.

Duties 
One of the roles of the sergeant at arms is to hold the gavel when not in use. The sergeant at arms can also compel the attendance of an absent senator when ordered to do so by the Senate.

With the architect of the Capitol and the House sergeant at arms, the sergeant at arms serves on the Capitol Police Board, responsible for security around the building.

The sergeant at arms can, upon orders of the Senate, arrest and detain any person who violates Senate rules, or is found in contempt of Congress.

The sergeant at arms is also the executive officer for the Senate and provides senators with computers, equipment, and repair and security services.

Staff and organization 
The office of the sergeant at arms of the Senate has between 800 and 900 staff, of the approximately 4,300 working for the Senate overall. Its budget is on the order of $200 million per year. Top officials reporting to the sergeant at arms include a deputy; a chief of staff; assistant sergeant at arms for intelligence and protective services; a CIO; an operations chief; Capitol operations; a general counsel; two legislative liaisons; and a CFO.

The main office of the sergeant at arms is in the Postal Square Building in Washington, D.C. The core computer operations are in that building, and the staff manages Internet and intranet connections to offices of senators both in the Capitol complex and back in their home states.

History 
The Office of the Doorkeeper was created on April 7, 1789 during the 1st United States Congress to address the Senate's inability to keep a majority of senators in the Capitol long enough to meet quorum and conduct business. The Senate had first convened on March 4, 1789, but only met quorum for the first time on April 6, 1789, one day before the appointment of the first doorkeeper, James C. Mathers. Because Senate sessions were held in private for the first six years, the doorkeeper was in charge of access to those sessions. When the sessions became public, the doorkeeper became in charge of security in the chamber and the gallery.

In 1798, the title of Sergeant at Arms was appended to the Office of the Doorkeeper after Mathers was authorized to compel former senator William Blount to return to Philadelphia and face an impeachment trial. Shortly afterwards the sergeant at arms was given additional powers to compel absent senators to attend sessions, which has typically been used to summon members when ending filibusters in the United States Senate.

In 1829, the sergeant at arms began supervising Senate pages, after the appointment of the first page. In 1854, the Senate's first postmaster and post office initially operated out of the sergeant at arms's office.

In 1867, the sergeant at arms was given regulation-making power to maintain, protect, and police the Capitol and the Senate Office Buildings. The sergeant at arms's role was also expanded to include serving as the Senate's wagon master and keeper of the Senate stables. In 1913, when the Senate purchased its first automobile for use by the vice president, the sergeant at arms also became responsible for leasing, maintenance, traffic control, and parking of all cars around the Capitol.

In 1897, James D. Preston, a doorkeeper in the Senate Press Gallery working under the sergeant at arms, began helping the reporters with collecting legislative bills, gathering information, and organizing interviews with senators. Preston was eventually installed as the first superintendent of the Senate Press Gallery. As new forms of media emerged in the 1930s and 1940s, this superintendent role expanded in parallel.

Martha S. Pope was the first woman to serve as Sergeant at Arms for either chamber, being elected by the Senate for the 102nd and 103rd Congresses.

On January 7, 2021, Senate Democratic Leader Chuck Schumer announced that he would fire the incumbent sergeant at arms, Michael C. Stenger, if he was not fired or did not resign prior to Schumer's being appointed as Senate Majority Leader. This announcement was made the day after the Capitol Building was attacked by a violent group of supporters of President Donald Trump. The attack resulted in the death of at least 5 people and extensive damage of more than $2 million of the building itself. On the same day, Mitch McConnell, the outgoing Senate Majority Leader, asked for and received Stenger's resignation, effective immediately. Deputy Sergeant at Arms Jennifer Hemingway was announced by McConnell as the acting sergeant-at-arms. On January 20, 2021, Eugene Goodman was announced as the acting deputy sergeant at arms of the United States Senate when stepping out onto the inauguration platform ahead of Kamala Harris.

List of the sergeants at arms of the Senate

List of the deputy sergeants at arms of the Senate

See also
 Sergeant at Arms of the United States House of Representatives
Serjeant-at-arms

References

External links

United States Senate
1789 establishments in the United States